Cinnamodendron is a genus of plants in family Canellaceae described as a genus in 1840.

Cinnamodendron is native to South America and the West Indies.

Species

References

 
Canellales genera
Neotropical realm flora